Sam E. Parish (born October 2, 1937) is a retired Chief Master Sergeant of the United States Air Force who served as the 8th Chief Master Sergeant of the Air Force from 1983 to 1986.

Early life

Parish was born in Marianna, Florida, and attended Malone High School. He joined the United States Air Force in December 1954.

Military career
Following basic military training, Parish was assigned to Chanute Air Force Base, Illinois, for training as a ground weather equipment operator where earned distinction as an honor graduate. His early assignments include Germany, Massachusetts, and Illinois. In March 1973, Parish graduated from the first class of the Senior Noncommissioned Officer Academy at Gunter Air Force Station, Alabama.  One of his classmates was James M. McCoy, who in August 1979 would be appointed as one of Parish's predecessors as the sixth Chief Master Sergeant of the Air Force. In August 1976, he began his third tour of duty in West Germany as sergeant major for the 36th Combat Support Group consolidated base personnel office at Bitburg Air Base, Germany. His career included tours as Senior Enlisted Advisor for 40th Air Division, US Air Forces in Europe, and Strategic Air Command.

Parish served as the Chief Master Sergeant of the Air Force from August 1983 to June 1986.

Awards and decorations

Professional memberships and associations

References

1937 births
Living people
Chief Master Sergeants of the United States Air Force
Recipients of the Legion of Merit
People from Marianna, Florida
Recipients of the Air Force Distinguished Service Medal
Recipients of the Meritorious Service Medal (United States)